Aurora Cunha (born 31 May 1959, in Ronfe, near Guimarães) is a retired long-distance runner from Portugal, living in Póvoa de Varzim. From 1984 to 1992 she represented her native country in three consecutive Olympic Games. Cunha's greatest successes were in road running, at which she  was a three-time World Champion. She also won several marathons during her career, including Paris (1988), Tokyo (1988), Chicago (1990) and Rotterdam (1992).

International competitions

References

1959 births
Living people
Portuguese female long-distance runners
Portuguese female marathon runners
Olympic athletes of Portugal
Athletes (track and field) at the 1984 Summer Olympics
Athletes (track and field) at the 1988 Summer Olympics
Athletes (track and field) at the 1992 Summer Olympics
Chicago Marathon female winners
Paris Marathon female winners
IAAF World Women's Road Race Championships winners
Sportspeople from Guimarães